Hugh Street Rugby Grounds, known also as Mike Carney Toyota Park is a sports venue located in the suburb of Currajong in Townsville, Queensland, Australia. The venue is owned by the Townsville and Districts Rugby Union (TDRU) and was officially opened on 11 March 1979.

The main ground has lighting and a grandstand with a seating capacity of approximately 2,000. As well being used for local rugby union matches, it is also one of the home grounds for the Queensland Country team that plays in the National Rugby Championship.

A redevelopment of the site was proposed in 2014 with the possibility of the TDRU moving to a new venue.

References

External links
 Satellite Image of Hugh Street Rugby Grounds

Rugby league stadiums in Australia
Rugby union stadiums in Australia
Sports venues in Townsville